is a Japanese voice actress. Hanamori used the alias Rimiyu in her debut, "The Second Audition".

Career
Hanamori became interested in acting during her second year in high school.

In 2015, Hanamori served as the 62nd personality of Radio Flush. In 2016, Hanamori made her anime film debut in Garakowa: Restore the World, where she voiced as Remo, the female protagonist. On October 22, 2015, Hanamori walked through the red carpet with producer Masashi Ishihama and Ryoichi Ishihara as a part of the Garakowa voice cast at the Tokyo International Film Festival.

Hanamori was affiliated to Pony Canyon Artists / Swallow. In 2017, Hanamori switched her affiliation to m&i. On November 1, 2019, it was announced that Hanamori would be "graduating" from Re:Stage! due to a knee injury.

On July 10, 2022, Hanamori tested positive for COVID-19.

Filmography

Anime series
Aiura (2013), Sōta Amaya
Ace of Diamond (2013–2015), Sachiko Umemoto
Sakura Trick (2014), Ai Kawatō
Yuki Yuna is a Hero (2014), Female Student – ep. 3
Rolling Girls (2015), Chiaya Misono
Ace of Diamond Second Season (2015–2016), Sachiko Umemoto
Etotama (2015), Uritan
Lance N' Masques (2015), Sae Igarashi
Yuruyuri San Hai! (2015), Female Student – ep. 10–11
Anne Happy (2016), Anne Hanakoizumi/Hanako
Rilu Rilu Fairilu (2016–2017), Lip
Magical Girl Raising Project (2016), Nemurin – ep. 1–2
Scorching Ping Pong Girls (2016), Koyori Tsumujikaze
Grimoire of Zero (2017), Zero
The Idolmaster Cinderella Girls Theater (2017), Shin Sato
Two Car (2017), Kurosu Itō
Yuki Yuna is a Hero: The Washio Sumi Chapter (2017), Gin Minowa
Laid-Back Camp (2018–2021), Nadeshiko Kagamihara
Overlord II (2018), Evileye
Caligula (2018), Shounen Doll
Seven Senses of the Re'Union (2018), Nozomi Kusaka
Happy Sugar Life (2018), Asahi Kōbe
Overlord III (2018), Evileye
That Time I Got Reincarnated as a Slime (2018–2019), Shizu
Radiant (2018–2020), Seth
Merc Storia: The Apathetic Boy and the Girl in a Bottle (2018), Toto
The Price of Smiles (2019), Yūki Soleil
Pastel Memories (2019), Nao Mejiro
Kaguya-sama: Love Is War (2019–present), Ai Hayasaka
Bakumatsu Crisis (2019), Mori Ranmaru
Hachigatsu no Cinderella Nine (2019), Akane Ukita
Re:Stage! Dream Days♪ (2019), Haruka Itsumura
Arifureta: From Commonplace to World's Strongest (2019–present), Shizuku Yaegashi
Kochoki: Wakaki Nobunaga (2019), Kichō
Demon Slayer: Kimetsu no Yaiba, (2019), Hinaki Ubuyashiki
Cautious Hero: The Hero Is Overpowered but Overly Cautious, (2019), Rosalie Roseguard
Darwin's Game (2020), Sui/Sōta
Keep Your Hands Off Eizouken! (2020), Doumeki
Heya Camp (2020), Nadeshiko Kagamihara
Smile Down the Runway (2020), Chiyuki Fujito
Iwa-Kakeru! Sport Climbing Girls (2020), Maruno Satō
One Room Third Season (2020), Saya Orisaki
Our Last Crusade or the Rise of a New World (2020), Rin Vispose
Akudama Drive (2020), Execution Division Pupil
Magatsu Wahrheit -Zuerst- (2020), Shake
Warlords of Sigrdrifa (2020), young Odin
Otherside Picnic (2021), Sorao Kamikoshi
Suppose a Kid from the Last Dungeon Boonies Moved to a Starter Town (2021), Lloyd Belladonna
Kemono Jihen (2021), Kon
Tropical-Rouge! Pretty Cure (2021), Sango Suzumura/Cure Coral
Shadows House (2021), Sophie
Seven Knights Revolution: Hero Successor (2021), Leda
Kageki Shojo!! (2021), Ai Narata
The Detective Is Already Dead (2021), Hel
Megaton Musashi (2021), Haruki Kitane
Blue Period (2021), Ryuji Ayukawa
Mieruko-chan (2021), Kyōsuke Yotsuya
The Fruit of Evolution (2021), Airi Seto
Tokyo 24th Ward (2022), Kana Shishido
Kotaro Lives Alone (2022), Ayano Kobayashi
The Dawn of the Witch (2022), Mysterious Witch
Don't Hurt Me, My Healer! (2022), Ryoko
Date A Live IV (2022), Nibelcole
Smile of the Arsnotoria the Animation (2022), Voynii
Call of the Night (2022), Akira Asai
Eternal Boys (2022), Ren Ukita
Bibliophile Princess (2022), Lilia
Is It Wrong to Try to Pick Up Girls in a Dungeon? IV (2023), Alise Lovell
Handyman Saitō in Another World (2023), Lilyza
Junji Ito Maniac: Japanese Tales of the Macabre (2023), Tsukiko Izumisawa
The Reincarnation of the Strongest Exorcist in Another World (2023), Seika Lamprogue
Trigun Stampede (2023), Young Knives
Boruto: Naruto Next Generations (2023), Daemon
Hell's Paradise: Jigokuraku (2023), Sagiri Yamada Asaemon
Too Cute Crisis (2023), Liza Luna
Helck (2023), Sharuami
Yumemiru Danshi wa Genjitsushugisha (2023), Kei Ashida

Anime films
Garakowa: Restore the World (2016), Remo
Yuki Yuna is a Hero: Washio Sumi Chapter (2017), Gin 
Laid-Back Camp Movie (2022), Nadeshiko Kagamihara
Kaguya-sama: Love Is War – The First Kiss That Never Ends (2022), Ai Hayasaka
Rakudai Majo: Fūka to Yami no Majo (2023), Karen

Video games
Crusader Quest (2015), Popo
MapleStory (2015), Dolphy
Rebellion Blade (2015), Amu
Yuki Yuna is a Hero: Memory of the Forest (2015), Gin Minowa
 The Caligula Effect (2016), Shonen-Doll
 The Idolmaster Cinderella Girls (2016), Shin Sato
 Alternative Girls (2017), Hina Momoi
 Blue Reflection (2017), Ako Ichinose
 Yuki Yuna is a Hero: Hanayui no Kirameki (2017), Gin Minowa
 Girl's Frontline (2018), A-91 & Cx4 Storm
 Azur Lane (2018), HMS Matchless, HMS Musketeer
 Dragalia Lost (2018), Fleur
 Our World is Ended (2019), Tatiana
 Dragon: Marked for Death (2019), Witch (Voice D)
 Fire Emblem: Three Houses (2019), Mercedes
 Gunvolt Chronicles: Luminous Avenger iX (2019), Kohaku
 Arknights (2019), Ifrit
 Epic Seven (2019), Yufine
 Ash Arms (2019), T-34, SBD-3 Dauntless.
 Fire Emblem Heroes (2019), Mercedes and Tanya
 Cytus 2 (2020), NEKO#ΦωΦ
 KonoSuba: Fantastic Days (2020), Lean
 Sangokushi Hadou (2020), Guan Yinping
 Granblue Fantasy (2020), Risette
 Fate/Grand Order (2020), Captain Nemo
 ALTDEUS: Beyond Chronos (2020), Noa
 Grandchase (2021), Lapis
 Genshin Impact (2021), Yanfei
 Toaru Majutsu no Index: Imaginary Fest (2021), Mitsuari Ayu
 Gate of Nightmares (2021-2022), Luisa / Chloe
 SoulWorker (2016-2022), Dhana Opini
 Guardian Tales (2023), Hana
 Blue Archive (2021), Takanashi Hoshino
 Laid-Back Camp - Virtual - Lake Motosu (2021), Nadeshiko Kagamihara

Radio
Etotama Radio: Soruraru Kurenya (2014-2016)
Radio Dot I Hanamori Yumiri no Ironna Yumiri wo Mite Yumiri (* ´▽｀*) (2015)
Yumiri to Aina no Mogumogu Communications (2016-ongoing)
Anne Happy Shiawase Radio (2016)
Shūkan Chotto Kowai Hanashi (2016)
Mahōsōjo Ikusei Keikaku SIDE D (2016-2017)
Zero no Sho Radio Zeroraji! (2017-ongoing)

Drama CD 
Strike Witches: Suomus Misfits Squadron ReBOOT! (2018), Haruka Sakomizu
My Stepmom's Daughter Is My Ex (2020), Isana Higashira

References

External links 

 Official agency profile 
 

1997 births
Living people
Japanese video game actresses
Japanese voice actresses
Voice actresses from Kanagawa Prefecture